A filling station, also known as a gas station or petrol station, is a facility that sells fuel and engine lubricants for motor vehicles. The most common fuels sold in the 2010s were gasoline (or petrol)  and diesel fuel. 

Gasoline pumps are used to pump gasoline, diesel, compressed natural gas, CGH2, HCNG, LPG, liquid hydrogen, kerosene, alcohol fuel (like methanol, ethanol, butanol, propanol), biofuels (like straight vegetable oil, biodiesel), or other types of fuel into the tanks within vehicles and calculate the financial cost of the fuel transferred to the vehicle. Besides gasoline pumps, one other significant device which is also found in filling stations and can refuel certain (compressed-air) vehicles is an air compressor, although generally these are just used to inflate car tires.

Many filling stations provide convenience stores, which may sell confections, alcoholic beverages, tobacco products, lottery tickets, soft drinks, snacks, coffee, newspapers, magazines, and, in some cases, a small selection of grocery items, such as milk. Some also sell propane or butane and have added shops to their primary business. Conversely, some chain stores, such as supermarkets, discount stores, warehouse clubs, or traditional convenience stores, have provided fuel pumps on the premises.

Terminology
In North America the fuel is known as "gasoline" or "gas" for short, and "gas station" and "service station" are used in the United States, Canada, and the Caribbean. In some regions of Canada, the term "gas bar" (or "gasbar") is used. In the rest of the English-speaking world the fuel is known as "petrol", and the term "petrol station" or "petrol pump" is used. In the United Kingdom, Ireland, New Zealand and South Africa "garage" and "forecourt" is still commonly used. Similarly, in Australia, New Zealand, the United Kingdom, and Ireland, the term "service station" describes any petrol station; Australians also call it a "servo". In India, Pakistan and Bangladesh, it is called a "petrol pump" or a "petrol bunk". In Japanese, a commonly used term is  although the abbreviation SS (for service station) is also used.

Worldwide numbers
 The UK has 8,385 filling stations , down from about 18,000 in 1992 and a peak of around 40,000 in the mid-1960s.
 The US had 114,474 stations in 2012, according to the US Census Bureau, down from 118,756 in 2007 and 121,446 in 2002.
 In Canada, the number is on the decline. As of December 2008, 12,684 were in operation, significantly down from about 20,000 stations recorded in 1989.
 In Japan, the number dropped from a peak of 60,421 in 1994 to 40,357 at the end of 2009.
 In Germany, the number dropped down to 14,300 in 2011.
 In China, according to different reports, the total number of gas/oil stations (at the end of 2018) is about 106,000.
 India—60,799 (as of November 2017)
 Russia—there were about 25,000 stations in the Russian Federation (2011)
 In Argentina, as of 2021, there are more than 5000 stations.

The largest filling station networks in Europe (2017)
 TotalEnergies—8,200 stations
 Shell—7,800 stations
 BP—7,000 stations
 Esso—6,100 stations
 Eni—5,500 stations
 Repsol—4,700 stations
 Q8—4,600 stations
 Avia—3,000 stations
 PKN Orlen—2,800 stations
 Circle K—2,700 stations

History

The first filling station was the city pharmacy in Wiesloch, Germany, where Bertha Benz refilled the tank of the first automobile on its maiden trip from Mannheim to Pforzheim back in 1888. Shortly thereafter other pharmacies sold gasoline as a side business. Since 2008 the Bertha Benz Memorial Route commemorates this event.

Brazil
The first "posto de gasolina" of South America was opened in Santos, São Paulo, Brazil, in 1920. It was located on Ana Costa Avenue, in front of the beach, in a corner that is located by the Hotel Atlântico, which occupies its area nowadays. It was owned by Esso and brought by Antonio Duarte Moreira, a taxi entrepreneur.

Russia

In Russia, the first filling stations appeared in 1911, when the Imperial Automobile Society signed an agreement with the partnership "Br. Nobel". By 1914 about 440 stations functioned in major cities across the country.

In the mid-1960s in Moscow there were about 250 stations. A significant boost in retail network development occurred with the mass launch of the car "Zhiguli" at the Volga Automobile Plant, which was built in Tolyatti in 1970. Gasoline for other than non-private cars was sold for ration cards only. This type of payment system stopped in the midst of perestroika in the early 1990s.

Since the saturation of automobile filling stations in Russia is insufficient and lags behind the leading countries of the world, there is a need to accommodate new stations in the cities and along the roads of different levels.

United States
The increase in automobile ownership after Henry Ford started to sell automobiles that the middle class could afford resulted in an increased demand for filling stations. The world's first purpose-built gas station was constructed in St. Louis, Missouri, in 1905 at 420 South Theresa Avenue. The second station was constructed in 1907 by Standard Oil of California (now Chevron) in Seattle, Washington, at what is now Pier 32. Reighard's Gas Station in Altoona, Pennsylvania claims that it dates from 1909 and is the oldest existing filling station in the United States.  Early on, they were known to motorists as "filling stations". These filling stations were known to wash your windows for free. 

The first "drive-in" filling station, Gulf Refining Company, opened to the motoring public in Pittsburgh on December 1, 1913, at Baum Boulevard and St Clair's Street. Prior to this, automobile drivers pulled into almost any general or hardware store, or even blacksmith shops in order to fill up their tanks. On its first day, the station sold  of gasoline at 27 cents per gallon (7 cents per litre). This was also the first architect-designed station and the first to distribute free road maps. The first alternative fuel station was opened in San Diego, California, by Pearson Fuels in 2003.

Maryland officials said that on September 26, 2019, RS Automotive in Takoma Park, Maryland became the first filling station in the country to convert to an EV charging station.

Design and function

Most filling stations are built in a similar manner, with most of the fueling installation underground, pump machines in the forecourt and a point of service inside a building. Single or multiple fuel tanks are usually deployed underground. Local regulations and environmental concerns may require a different method, with some stations storing their fuel in container tanks, entrenched surface tanks or unprotected fuel tanks deployed on the surface. Fuel is usually offloaded from a tanker truck into each tank by gravity through a separate capped opening located on the station's perimeter. Fuel from the tanks travels to the dispenser pumps through underground pipes. For every fuel tank, direct access must be available at all times. Most tanks can be accessed through a service canal directly from the forecourt.

Older stations tend to use a separate pipe for every kind of available fuel and for every dispenser. Newer stations may employ a single pipe for every dispenser. This pipe houses a number of smaller pipes for the individual fuel types. Fuel tanks, dispenser and nozzles used to fill car tanks employ vapor recovery systems, which prevents releases of vapor into the atmosphere with a system of pipes. The exhausts are placed as high as possible. A vapor recovery system may be employed at the exhaust pipe. This system collects the vapors, liquefies them and releases them back into the lowest grade fuel tank available.

The forecourt is the part of a filling station where vehicles are refueled. Gasoline pumps are placed on concrete plinths, as a precautionary measure against collision by motor vehicles. Additional elements may be employed, including metal barriers. The area around the gasoline pumps must have a drainage system. Since fuel sometimes spills onto the pavement, as little of it as possible should remain.  Any liquids present on the forecourt will flow into a channel drain before it enters a petrol interceptor which is designed to capture any hydrocarbon pollutants and filter these from rainwater which may then proceed to a sanitary sewer, stormwater drain, or to ground.

If a filling station allows customers to pay at the dispenser, the data from the dispenser may be transmitted via RS-232, RS-485 or Ethernet to the point of sale, usually inside the filling station's building, and fed into the station's cash register operating system. The cash register system gives a limited control over the gasoline pump, and is usually limited to allowing the clerks to turn the pumps on and off. A separate system is used to monitor the fuel tank's status and quantities of fuel. With sensors directly in the fuel tank, the data is fed to a terminal in the back room, where it can be downloaded or printed out. Sometimes this method is bypassed, with the fuel tank data transmitted directly to an external database.

Underground filling stations
The underground modular filling station is a construction model for filling stations that was developed and patented by U-Cont Oy Ltd in Finland in 1993. Afterwards the same system was used in Florida, US. Above-ground modular stations were built in the 1980s in eastern Europe and especially in Soviet Union, but they were not built in other parts of Europe due to the stations' lack of safety in case of fire.

The construction model for underground modular filling station makes the installation time shorter, designing easier and manufacturing less expensive. As a proof of the model's installation speed an unofficial world record of filling station installation was made by U-Cont Oy Ltd when a modular filling station was built in Helsinki, Finland in less than three days, including groundwork. The safety of modular filling stations has been tested in a filling station simulator, in Kuopio, Finland. These tests have included for instance burning cars and explosions in the station simulator.

Marketing

North America
In the United States and Canada, there are generally two marketing types of filling stations: premium brands and discount brands.

Premium brands

Filling stations with premium brands sell well-recognized and often international brands of fuel, including Exxon/Mobil and its Esso brand, Phillips 66/Conoco/76, Chevron, Mobil, Shell, Husky Energy, Sunoco (US), BP, Valero and Texaco. Non-international premium brands include Petrobras, Petro-Canada (owned by Suncor Energy Canada), QuikTrip, Hess, Sinclair, and Pemex. Premium-brand stations accept credit cards, often issue their own company cards (fuel cards or fleet cards) and may charge higher prices. In some cases, fuel cards for customers with a lower fuel consumption are ordered not directly from an oil company, but from an intermediary. Many premium brands have fully automated pay-at-the-pump facilities. Premium stations tend to be highly visible from highway and freeway exits, utilizing tall signs to display their brand logos.

Discount brands
Discount brands are often smaller, regional chains or independent stations, offering lower prices on fuel. Most purchase wholesale commodity gasoline from independent suppliers or from the major petroleum companies. Lower-priced stations are also found at some supermarkets (Albertsons, Kroger, Big Y, Ingles, Lowes Foods, Giant, Weis Markets, Safeway, Hy-Vee, Vons, Meijer, Loblaws/Real Canadian Superstore, and Giant Eagle), convenience stores (7-Eleven, Circle K, Cumberland Farms, QuickChek, Road Ranger, Sheetz and Wawa), discount stores (Walmart, Canadian Tire) and warehouse clubs (Costco, Sam's Club, and BJ's Wholesale Club). At some stations (such as Vons, Costco, BJ's Wholesale Club, or Sam's Club), consumers are required to hold a special membership card in order to be eligible for the discounted price, or pay only with the chain's cash card, debt card or a credit card issuer exclusive to that chain. In some areas, such as New Jersey, this practice is illegal, and stations are required to sell to all at the same price. Some convenience stores, such as 7-Eleven and Circle K, have co-branded their stations with one of the premium brands. After the Gulf Oil company was sold to Chevron, northeastern retail units were sold off as a chain, with Cumberland Farms controlling the remaining Gulf Oil outlets in the United States.

State-controlled stations

Some countries have only one brand of filling station. In Mexico, where the oil industry is state-owned and prices are regulated, the country's main operator of filling stations is Pemex. In Malaysia, Shell is the dominant player by number of stations, with government-owned Petronas coming in second. In Indonesia, the dominant player by number of stations is the government-owned Pertamina, although other companies such as TotalEnergies and Shell are increasingly found in big cities such as the capital Jakarta or Surabaya.

Global and local branding

Some companies, such as Shell, use their brand worldwide, however, Chevron uses its inherited brand Caltex in Asia Pacific, Australia and Africa, and its Texaco brand in Europe and Latin America. ExxonMobil uses its Exxon and Mobil brands but is still known as Esso (the forerunner company name, Standard Oil or S.O.) in many places, most noticeably in Canada. In Brazil, the main operators are Petrobras Distribuidora and Ipiranga, but Esso and Shell are also present. In the United Kingdom, the two largest are BP and Shell. The "Big Four" supermarket chains, Morrisons, Sainsbury's, Asda and Tesco, all operate filling stations, as well as some of the smaller supermarkets such as The Co-operative Group and Waitrose. Indian Oil operates approximately 15,000 stations in India. In Japan, the main operators are Cosmo Oil, Idemitsu (under the brand names apollostation and Idemitsu),
ENEOS Corporation (under the brand names ENEOS, Express and General) and Mitsubishi Group (operates self-service stations under the Lawson convenience store branding), although foreign brands such as Shell (operated by Idemitsu since its acquisition of Showa Shell Sekiyu in 2018–2019), and formerly Esso and Mobil (previously operated by ENEOS Corporation under license from ExxonMobil, all rebranded to ENEOS in 2019) are also present.

Payment methods

Australia and New Zealand
Most service stations allow the customer to pump the fuel before paying. In recent years, some service stations have required customers to purchase their fuel first. In some small towns, the customer may hand the cash to the attendant on the forecourt if they are paying for a set amount of fuel and have no change; but usually customers will enter the service centre to pay a cashier. Some supermarkets have their own forecourts which are unmanned and payment is pay-at-pump only. Customers at the supermarket will receive a discount voucher which offers discounted fuel at their forecourt. The amount of discount varies depending on the amount spent on groceries at the supermarket, but normally starts at 4 cents a litre.

In New Zealand BP has an app for smartphones that detects a user's location, then allows one to select the type of fuel, which pump, and how much to spend. The amount is then deducted from the user's account.

Canada
In British Columbia and Alberta, it is a legal requirement that customers either pre-pay for the fuel or pay at the pump. The law is called "Grant's Law" and is intended to prevent "gas-and-dash" crimes, where a customer refuels and then drives away without paying for it.
In other provinces, payment after filling is permitted and widely available, though some stations may require either a pre-payment or a payment at the pump during night hours.

Ireland
In the Republic of Ireland, most stations allow customers to pump fuel before paying. Some stations have pay-at-the-pump facilities.

United Kingdom

A large majority of stations allow customers to pay with a chip and pin payment card or pay in the shop. Many have a pay at the pump system, where customers can enter their PIN prior to refueling.

United States
Pre-payment is the norm in the US and customers may typically pay either at the pump or inside the gas station. Modern stations have pay-at-the-pump functions: in most cases credit, debit, ATM cards, fuel cards and fleet cards are accepted. Occasionally a station will have a pay-at-the-pump-only period per day, when attendants are not present, often at night, and some stations are pay-at-the-pump only 24 hours a day.

Types of service
Filling stations typically offer one of three types of service to their customers: full service, minimum service or self-service.

Full service
An attendant operates the pumps, often wipes the windshield, and sometimes checks the vehicle's oil level and tire pressure, then collects payment and perhaps a small tip.

Minimum service
An attendant operates the pumps. This is often required due to legislation that prohibits customers from operating the pumps.

Self service
The customer performs all required service. Signs informing the customer of filling procedures and cautions are displayed on each pump. Customers can still enter a store or go to a booth to give payment to a person.

Unmanned
Using cardlock (or pay-at-the-pump) system, these are completely unstaffed.

Brazil

In Brazil, self-service fuel filling is illegal, due to a federal law enacted in 2000. The law was introduced by Federal Deputy Aldo Rebelo, who claims it saved 300,000 fuel attendant jobs across the country.

Japan

Before 1998, filling stations in Japan were entirely full-service stations. Self-service stations were legalized in Japan in 1998 following the abolition of the Special Petroleum Law, which led to the deregulation of the petroleum industry in Japan.

North America

In the past, filling stations in the United States offered a choice between full service and self service. Before 1970, full service was the norm, and self-service was rare. Today, few stations advertise or provide full service. Full service stations are more common in wealthy and upscale areas. The cost of full service is usually assessed as a fixed amount per US gallon.

The first self-service station in the United States was in Los Angeles, opened in 1947 by Frank Urich. In Canada, the first self-service station opened in Winnipeg, Manitoba, in 1949. It was operated by the independent company Henderson Thriftway Petroleum, owned by Bill Henderson.

In New Jersey, filling stations offer only full service (and mini service); attendants there are required to pump gasoline for customers. Customers, in fact, are prohibited by law from pumping their own gasoline. The only exception to this within New Jersey is at the filling station next to Joint Base McGuire-Dix-Lakehurst in Wrightstown. New Jersey prohibited self-service in 1949, with the passage of "Retail Gasoline Dispensing Safety Act," after lobbying by service station owners. That laws states that "Because of the fire hazards directly associated with dispensing fuel, it is in the public interest that gasoline station operators have the control needed over that activity to ensure compliance with appropriate safety procedures, including turning off vehicle engines and refraining from smoking while fuel is dispensed." Proponents of the prohibition cite safety and jobs as reasons to keep the ban. Of note, the ban does not apply to the pumping of diesel fuel at filling stations (though individual filling stations may prohibit this); nor does it apply to the pumping of gasoline into boats or aircraft. 

Similarly, Oregon, with few exceptions, also mandates full service at most service stations. The exception to this regulation is that a filling station may be self-service if located in a county with a population of 40,000 or less. The only exception to this within Oregon is at the filling stations next to the Indian reservation casinos in Pendleton and Grand Ronde, which are permitted to be self service. Oregon prohibited self-service in a 1951 statute prohibiting that listed 17 different justifications, including flammability, the risk of crime from customers leaving their vehicles, toxic fumes, and the jobs created by requiring mini service. Like New Jersey, the Oregon self-service prohibitions do not apply to the pumping of diesel fuel at filling stations (though individual filling stations may prohibit this). Motorcycle owners may pump their own with the service station attendant present, and non-retail customers may also pump their own gas.

Oregon's ban on self-service gasoline is also seen as part of Oregonian culture. One commentator noted, "The joke is when babies are born in Oregon, the doctor slaps their bottom, 'No self-serve and no sales tax'... It's as much a cultural issue as an economic issue. It's a way of life." However, recent years have shown that this opinion might be changing, as a 2014 Public Policy Poll showed that although self-serve was favored by a narrow margin of all Oregonians, Oregonians under 45 favored self-serve gas by 53 percent to 33 percent.
In 1982 Oregon voters rejected a ballot measure sponsored by the service station owners, which would have legalized self-service. Oregon legislators passed a bill that was signed into law by the Governor in May 2017 to allow self-service for counties with a total population of 40,000 or less beginning in January 2018.

The constitutionality of the self-service bans has been disputed. The Oregon statute was brought into court in 1989 by ARCO, and the New Jersey statute was challenged in court in 1950 by a small independent service station, Rein Motors. Both challenges failed. Former New Jersey governor Jon Corzine sought to lift the ban on self-service for New Jersey. He asserted that it would be able to lower gas prices, but some New Jerseyans argued that it could cause drawbacks, especially unemployment.

The town of Huntington, New York has prohibited self-service stations since the early 1970s firstly to prevent theft and later due to safety concerns.

Contrary to popular belief, lit cigarettes are not capable of igniting gasoline. However, several states outlaw smoking at gas stations as the fire from the ignition source used to light the cigarette can ignite gasoline vapors. Most gas stations and many municipalities will also explicitly ban any smoking activity within certain distances of gasoline pumps.

Other goods and services commonly available

Many stations provide toilet facilities for customer use, as well as squeegees and paper towels for customers to clean their vehicle's windows. Discount stations may not provide these amenities in some countries.

Stations typically have an air compressor, typically with a built-in or provided handheld tire-pressure gauge, to inflate tires and a hose to add water to vehicle radiators. Some air compressor machines are free of charge, while others charge a small fee to use (typically 50 cents to a dollar in North America). In US states, such as California, state law requires that paying customers must be provided with free air compressor service and radiator water.

In some regions of America and Australia, many filling stations have a mechanic on duty, but this practice has died out in other parts of the world.

Many filling stations have integrated convenience stores which sell food, beverages, and often cigarettes, lottery tickets, motor oil, and auto parts. Prices for these items tend to be higher than they would be at a supermarket or discount store.

Many stations, particularly in the United States, have a fast food outlet inside. These are usually "express" versions with limited seating and limited menus, though some may be regular-sized and have spacious seating.  Larger restaurants are common at truck stops and toll road service plazas.

In some US states, beer, wine, and liquor are sold at filling stations, though this practice varies according to state law (see Alcohol laws of the United States by state). Nevada also allows the operation of slot and video poker machines without time restrictions.

Vacuum cleaners, often coin-operated, are a common amenity to allow the cleaning of vehicle interiors, either by the customer or by an attendant.

Some stations are equipped with car washes. Car washes are sometimes offered free of charge or at a discounted price with a certain amount of fuel purchased. Conversely, some car washes operate filling stations to supplement their businesses.

From approximately 1920 to 1980, many service stations in the US provided free road maps affiliated with their parent oil companies to customers.  This practice fell out of favor due to the 1970s energy crisis.

Fuel prices

Europe

In European Union member states, gasoline prices are much higher than in North America due to higher fuel excise or taxation, although the base price is also higher than in the US. Occasionally, price rises trigger national protests. In the UK, a large-scale protest in August and September 2000, known as 'The Fuel Crisis', caused wide-scale havoc not only across the UK, but also in some other EU countries. The UK Government eventually backed down by indefinitely postponing a planned increase in fuel duty. This was partially reversed during December 2006 when then-Chancellor of the Exchequer Gordon Brown raised fuel duty by 1.25 pence per liter.

Since 2007, gasoline prices in the UK rose by nearly 40 pence per liter, going from 97.3 pence per liter in 2007 to 136.8 pence per liter in 2012.

In much of Europe, including the UK, France and Germany, stations operated by large supermarket chains usually price fuel lower than stand-alone stations. In most of mainland Europe, sales tax is lower on diesel fuel than on gasoline, and diesel is accordingly the cheaper fuel: in the UK and Switzerland, diesel has no tax advantage and retails at a higher price by quantity than gasoline (offset by its higher energy yield).

In 2014, according to Eurostat, the mean EU28 price was €1.38 /L for euro-super 95 (gasoline), €1.26 /L for diesel.
The least expensive gasoline was in Estonia at €1.10 /L, and the most expensive at €1.57 /L in Italy.
The least expensive diesel was in Estonia at €1.14 /L, and the most expensive at €1.54 /L in the UK.
The least expensive LPG was in Belgium at €0.50 /L, and the most expensive at €0.83 /L in France.

North America

Nearly all filling stations in North America advertise their prices on large signs outside the stations.  Some locations have laws requiring such signage.

In Canada and the United States, federal, state or provincial, and local sales taxes are usually included in the price, although tax details are often posted at the pump and some stations may provide details on sales receipts. Gasoline taxes are often ring-fenced (dedicated) to fund transportation projects such as the maintenance of existing roads and the construction of new ones.

Individual filling stations in the United States have little if any control over gasoline prices. The wholesale price of gasoline is determined according to area by oil companies which supply the gasoline, and their prices are largely determined by the world markets for oil. Individual stations are unlikely to sell gasoline at a loss, and the profit margin—typically between 7 and 11 cents a US gallon (2–3 cents per liter)—that they make from gasoline sales is limited by competitive pressures: a gas station which charges more than others will lose customers to them.  Most stations try to compensate by selling higher-margin food products in their convenience stores.

Even with oil market fluctuations, prices for gasoline in the United States are among the lowest in the industrialized world; this is principally due to lower taxes. While the sales price of gasoline in Europe is more than twice that in the United States, the price excluding taxes is nearly identical in the two areas. Some Canadians and Mexicans in communities close to the US border drive into the United States to purchase cheaper gasoline.

Due to heavy fluctuations in price in the United States, some stations offer their customers the option to buy and store gasoline for future uses, such as the service provided by First Fuel Bank.

In order to save money, some consumers in Canada and the United States inform each other about low and high prices through the use of gasoline price websites. Such websites allow users to share prices advertised at filling stations with each other by posting them to a central server. Consumers then may check the prices listed in their geographic area in order to select the station with the lowest price available at the time. Some television and radio stations also compile pricing information via viewer and listener reports of pricing or reporter observations and present it as a regular segment of their newscasts, usually before or after traffic reports. These price observations must usually be made by reading the pricing signs outside stations, as many companies do not give their prices by telephone due to competitive concerns. It is a criminal offense to have written or verbal arrangements with competitors, suppliers or customers for:

 Fixing prices and exchanging information on prices or cost (including discounts and rebates),
 Limiting or restraining competition unduly,
 Engaging in misleading or deceptive practices.

Gas stations must never hold discussions with other competitors regarding pricing policies and methods, terms of sale, costs, allocation of markets or boycotts of our petroleum products.

Rest of the world

In other energy-importing countries such as Japan, gasoline and petroleum product prices are higher than in the United States because of fuel transportation costs and taxes.

On the other hand, some of the major oil-producing countries such as the Gulf states, Iran, Iraq, and Venezuela provide subsidized fuel at well-below world market prices. This practice tends to encourage heavy consumption.

Hong Kong has some of the highest pump prices in the world, but most customers are given discounts as card members.

In Western Australia a program called FuelWatch requires most filling stations to notify their "tomorrow prices" by 2pm each day; prices are changed at 6am each morning, and must be held for 24 hours. Each afternoon, the prices for the next day are released to the public and the media, allowing consumers to decide when to fill up.

Service stations

A service station or "servo" is the terminology often used in Australia, along with petrol station, to describe any facility where motorists can refuel their cars.

In New Zealand a filling station is often referred to as a service station, petrol station or garage, even though it may not offer mechanical repairs or assistance with dispensing fuel. Levels of service available include full service, for which assistance in dispensing fuel is offered, as well as offers to check tire pressure or clean vehicle windscreens. That type of service is becoming uncommon in New Zealand, particularly Auckland. Further south of Auckland, many filling stations offer full service. There is also help service or assisted service, for which customers must request assistance before it is given, and self-service, for which no assistance is available.

In the US, a filling station that also offers services such as oil changes and mechanical repairs to automobiles is called a service station. Until the 1970s the vast majority of filling stations were service stations. These stations typically offered free air for inflating tires, as compressed air was already on hand to operate the repair garage's pneumatic tools.  While a few filling stations with a service station remain, many in the 1980s and 1990s were converted to convenience stores while still selling fuel, while others continued to offer services but discontinued offering fuel.

This kind of business provided the name for the US comic strip Gasoline Alley, where a number of the characters worked.

In the UK and Ireland, a 'service station' refers to much larger facilities, usually attached to motorways (see rest area) or major truck routes, which provide food outlets, large parking areas, and often other services such as hotels, arcade games, and shops in addition to 24-hour fuel supplies and a higher standard of restrooms. Fuel is typically more expensive from these outlets due to their premium locations. UK or Irish service stations do not usually repair automobiles.

Highway service centre

This arrangement occurs on many toll roads and some interstate freeways and is called an oasis or service plaza.  In many cases, these centers might have a food court or restaurants. In the United Kingdom and Ireland these are called motorway service areas.

Often, the state government maintains public rest areas directly connected to freeways, but does not rent out space to private businesses, as this is specifically prohibited by law via the Interstate Highway Act of 1956 which created the national Interstate Highway System, except sites on freeways built before January 1, 1960, and toll highways that are self-supporting but have Interstate designation, under a grandfather clause.  As a result, such areas often provide only minimal services such as restrooms and vending machines.

Private entrepreneurs develop additional facilities, such as truck stops or travel centers, restaurants, gas stations, and motels in clusters on private land adjacent to major interchanges.  In the US, Pilot Flying J and TravelCenters of America are two of the most common full-service chains of truck stops. Because these facilities are not directly connected to the freeway, they usually have huge signs on poles high enough to be visible by motorists in time to exit from the freeway. Sometimes, the state also posts small official signs (normally blue) indicating what types of filling stations, restaurants, and hotels are available at an upcoming exit; businesses may add their logos to these signs for a fee.

In Canada, the province of Ontario has stops along two of its 400-series highways, the 401 and the 400, traditionally referred to as "Service Centres", but recently renamed "ONroute" as part of a full rebuild of the sites. Owned by the provincial government, but leased to private operator Host Kilmer Service Centres, they contain food courts, convenience stores, washrooms, and co-located gas and diesel bars with attached convenience stores. Food providers include Tim Hortons (at all sites), A&W, Wendy's and Pizza Pizza. At most sites fuel is sold by Canadian Tire, with a few older Esso gas bars at earlier renovated locations.

Octane

In Australia, gasoline is unleaded, and available in 91, 95, 98 and 100 octane (names differ from brand to brand). Fuel additives for use in cars designed for leaded fuel are available at most filling stations.

In Canada, the most commonly found octane grades are 87 (regular), 89 (mid grade) and 91 (premium), using the same "(R+M)/2 Method" used in the US (see below).

In China, the most commonly found octane grade is RON 91 (regular), 93 (mid grade) and 97 (premium). Almost all of the fuel has been unleaded since 2000.  In some premium filling stations in large cities, such as Petrol China and Sinopec, RON 98 gas is sold for racing cars.

In Europe, gasoline is unleaded and available in 95 RON (Eurosuper) and, in nearly all countries, 98 RON (Super Plus) octanes; in some countries 91 RON octane gasoline is offered as well. In addition, 100 RON is offered in some countries in continental Europe (Shell markets this as V-Power Racing). Some stations offer 98 RON with lead substitute (often called Lead-Replacement Petrol, or LRP).

In New Zealand, gasoline is unleaded, and most commonly available in 91 RON ("Regular") and 95 RON ("Premium"). 98 RON is available at selected BP ("Ultimate") and Mobil ("Synergy 8000") service stations instead of the standard 95 RON. 96 RON was replaced by 95 RON, and subsequently abolished in 2006. Leaded fuel was abolished in 1996.

In the UK the most common gasoline grade (and lowest octane generally available) is 'Premium' 95 RON unleaded. 'Super' is widely available at 97 RON (for example Shell V-Power, BP Ultimate). Leaded fuel is no longer available.

In the United States all motor vehicle gasoline is unleaded and is available in several grades with different octane rating; 87 (Regular), 89 (Mid-Grade), and 93 (Premium) are typical grades. At high altitudes in the Mountain States and the Black Hills of South Dakota, regular unleaded can be as low as 85 octane; this practice has become increasingly controversial, since it was instituted when most cars had carburetors instead of the fuel injection and electronic engine controls standard in recent decades.

In the US gasoline is described in terms of its "pump octane", which is the mean of their "RON" (Research Octane Number) and "MON" (Motor Octane Number). Labels on pumps in the US typically describe this as the "(R+M)/2 Method". Some nations describe fuels according to the traditional RON or MON ratings, so octane ratings cannot always be compared with the equivalent US rating by the "(R+M)/2 method".

Differences in gasoline pumps

In Europe, New Zealand and Australia, the customer selects one of several color-coded nozzles depending on the type of fuel required. The filler pipe of unleaded fuel is smaller than the one for fuels for engines designed to take leaded fuel. The tank filler opening has a corresponding diameter; this prevents inadvertently using leaded fuel in an engine not designed for it, which can damage a catalytic converter. 
In most stations in Canada and the US, the pump has a single nozzle and the customer selects the desired octane grade by pushing a button. Some pumps require the customer to pick up the nozzle first, then lift a lever underneath it; others are designed so that lifting the nozzle automatically releases a switch.  Some newer stations have separate nozzles for different types of fuel. Where diesel fuel is provided, it is usually dispensed from a separate nozzle even if the various grades of gasoline share the same nozzle.

Motorists occasionally pump gasoline into a diesel car by accident. Diesel fuel in a gasoline engine—while creating large amounts of smoke—does not normally cause permanent damage if it is drained once the mistake is realized. However even a liter of gasoline added to the tank of a modern diesel car can cause irreversible damage to the injection pump and other components through a lack of lubrication. In some cases, the car has to be scrapped because the cost of repairs exceeds its residual value. The issue is not clear-cut as older diesels using completely mechanical injection can tolerate some gasoline—which has historically been used to "thin" diesel fuel in winter.

Legislation

In most countries, stations are subjected to guidelines and regulations which exist to minimize the potential of fires, and increase safety.

It is prohibited to use open flames and, in some places, mobile phones on the forecourt of a filling station because of the risk of igniting gasoline vapor. In the US the fire marshal is responsible for regulations at the pump. Most localities ban smoking, open flames and running engines. Since the increased occurrence of static-related fires many stations have warnings about leaving the refueling point.

Cars can build up static charge by driving on dry road surfaces. However many tire compounds contain enough carbon black to provide an electrical ground which prevents charge build-up. Newer "high mileage" tires use more silica and can increase the buildup of static. A driver who does not discharge static by contacting a conductive part of the car will carry it to the insulated handle of the nozzle and the static potential will eventually be discharged when this purposely-grounded arrangement is put into contact with the metallic filler neck of the vehicle. Ordinarily, vapor concentrations in the area of this filling operation are below the lower explosive limit (LEL) of the product being dispensed, so the static discharge causes no problem. The problem with ungrounded gasoline cans results from a combination of vehicular static charge, the potential between the container and the vehicle, and the loose fit between the grounded nozzle and the gas can. This last condition causes a rich vapor concentration in the ullage (the unfilled volume) of the gas can, and a discharge from the can to the grounded hanging hardware (the nozzle, hose, swivels and break-a-ways) can thus occur at a most inopportune point. The Petroleum Equipment Institute has recorded incidents of static-related ignition at refueling sites since early 2000.

Although urban legends persist that using a mobile phone while pumping gasoline can cause sparks or explosion, this has not been duplicated under any controlled condition. Nevertheless, mobile phone manufacturers and gas stations ask users to switch off their phones. One suggested origin of this myth is said to have been started by gas station companies because the cell phone signal would interfere with the fuel counter on some older model fuel pumps causing it to give a lower reading. In the MythBusters episode "Cell Phone Destruction", investigators concluded that explosions attributed to cell phones could be caused by static discharges from clothing instead and also observed that such incidents seem to involve women more often than men.

The US National Fire Protection Association does most of the research and code writing to address the potential for explosions of gasoline vapor. Above this height, where most fuel filler necks are located, there is no expectation of an explosive concentration of gasoline vapor in normal operating conditions. Electrical equipment in the fueling area may be specially certified for use around gasoline vapors.

See also
 Autogas (LPG)
 Automated fueling
 Biofuels
 Convenience store
 Ethanol
 Filling station attendant
 Gas pump
 Gasoline usage and pricing
 Gasoline
 Highway oasis
 Hydrogen station
 List of automotive fuel retailers
 LPG tank connections
 National Association of Convenience Stores
 Petroleum
 Propellant depot (a gas station in space)
 Road trip

Explanatory notes

References

Further reading 

  – Grayscale photos taken 1978 to 1982. Review.

External links

 
 Fill'er Up—Documentary produced by Wisconsin Public Television

 
1888 in Germany
Fuels